The Hawkesbury Hawks are a Junior "A" ice hockey team from Hawkesbury, Ontario, Canada.  They are a part of the Central Canada Hockey League (CCHL).

History
The Hawks were formed by a group of local businessmen in March 1974.  From 1974 until 1976 the Hawks were a part of the Eastern Ontario Junior B Hockey League.  After making the jump to the Central Junior A Hockey League in 1976, the Hawks found themselves in the basement of the league in their first season—although they quickly rose through the ranks in the seasons following.  In 1979, the team won the CJHL Championship and moved on to the Centennial Cup where they lost the semi-finals to the Ontario Hockey Association's Guelph Platers—the eventual champion.  The 1980 season saw them win the Bogart Cup as CJHL Champions again.  This time they lost in the quarter-finals of the National Championship to Quebec Junior AAA Hockey League Champion Joliette Cyclones.

1990 saw the Hawks rise to glory once again as CJHL Champions, but an opening round loss in the national Championships to Quebec's Le Collège Français de Longueuil spelled the end of a National Championship run.  In 1991, the team won the league again and then also hosted the Central Canadian Championship where they lost the semi-final to the Sudbury Junior Wolves of the Northern Ontario Junior Hockey League.

1998-99 was a big year for the Hawkesbury Hawks as they won their first CJHL championship since 1991 by defeating the defending Art Bogart Cup and Fred Page Cup champions Brockville Braves in 6 games. Their trip to the Royal Bank Cup in Yorkton would be cut short as they were defeated by the hosts Charlottetown Abbies 2-0 in the Fred Page Cup final.

The Hawkesbury Hawks would go from not winning a quarter-final series from 2000 to 2004, until the 2004-05 season came as a surprise as they managed to defeat the Gloucester Rangers in 7 games, despite leading 3-0 and the Rangers coming back to force game 7. They would also defeat the second-heavily favored Cornwall in 6 games, and make the league finals against Nepean. Ironically, this series went to game 7 where the Hawks won 6-1 (they broke a league record for the most goals in a short time). Hawkesbury clinched their first Art Bogart Cup since 1999. At the Fred Page Cup, it wasn't the exact measure of revenge as the Hawks defeated the hosts Yarmouth Mariners 4-3 in the final, but it was still a trip earned to the Royal Bank Cup in Weyburn, Saskatchewan. The Hawks lost their best player and captain Martin Beaulne, who ruptured his spleen. On the way home to Hawkesbury, the team turned around and went to the hospital in Fredericton, New Brunswick because Beaulne was in pain and needed medical attention. The Hawks traveled without their captain able to play in the tournament, and the Hawks, who were needing a win against Portage to earn a berth in the quarter-finals, got the win in overtime. However, it was the Weyburn Red Wings they were facing. The Hawks tied the game seconds left in regulation, and lost the game in overtime sending the eventual Royal Bank Cup champions to the final.

With plenty of returning players, the Hawkesbury Hawks lost their coach Eric Veilleux (who became head coach in 2002-03) took a job with the Shawinigan Cataractes of the QMJHL. This left the Hawks finding a replacement in Jeff Carter, who managed to lead the Hawks back to the league finals and win back-to-back CCHL champions, this time against the Nepean Raiders. However, their venture at the Fred Page Cup in Pembroke ended in the semi-finals after losing to the Joliette Action.

The Hawks fell apart as players, who played in the championship years graduated. The Hawks hit rock-bottom in the standings with only eight wins in 2008–09. Several players demanded trades, walked off the team or went elsewhere to resume their junior "A" hockey careers.

The 2009–10 season saw the Hawks go under new ownership, management and coaching staff. The Hawks brought in rookie coach Martin Dagenais, who also served as the acting general manager. Richard Morris stepped in as assistant coach., while Ian Henderson was brought on to the staff as assistant general manager and the director of player personnel. An entire new scouting staff was added as part of the new groups rebuilding plan for the franchise. By December, the Hawks had already matched the win total from the previous season with one of the youngest teams in the CJHL.

After back to back disappointing seasons 2012-2014 the Hawks needed a change. Owner Sylvain Landers made a dramatic move and brought in Head coach Rick Dorval. Dorval brought with him a successful track record of turning around struggling franchises with the Gloucester Rangers and the Ottawa Jr Sens achieving Coach of the Year in 2012-2013. In the 2014-2015 season the Hawks went from last in the league standings to fifth overall. With a rebuilt team in 2015-2016 the Hawks continued to move forward finishing third overall with only three points separating them from first place.

For the 2015-16 CCHL season, the Hawks dropped their original colors of Blue, Gold, Red and White and adopted the same colors of the Vancouver Canucks consisting of Blue, Green and White.

Season-by-Season record
Note: GP = Games Played, W = Wins, L = Losses, T = Ties, OTL = Overtime Losses, GF = Goals for, GA = Goals against

Fred Page Cup 
Eastern Canada Championships
MHL - QAAAJHL - CCHL - Host
Round robin play with 2nd vs 3rd in semi-final to advance against 1st in the finals.

Royal Bank Cup
CANADIAN NATIONAL CHAMPIONSHIPS
Dudley Hewitt Champions - Central, Fred Page Champions - Eastern, Western Canada Cup Champions - Western, Western Canada Cup - Runners Up and Host
Round robin play with top 4 in semi-final and winners to finals.

Championships
CJHL Bogart Cup Championships: 1979, 1980, 1990, 1991, 1999, 2005, 2006
Eastern Canadian Fred Page Cup Championships: 2005
CJAHL Royal Bank Cup Championships: None

Notable alumni
Derek Armstrong
Jesse Boulerice
Jeff Brown
Bruce Cassidy
Jim Culhane
Jim Kyte
Denis Larocque
Marquis Mathieu
Sandy McCarthy
Dan McGillis
Ken McRae
Gino Odjick
Benoit Pouliot
Bruce Racine
Mike Rowe
Martin St. Louis
Martin St. Pierre

External links
Hawkesbury Hawks Website

Central Canada Hockey League teams
Hawkesbury, Ontario
Ice hockey clubs established in 1974